Andrei Anatolievič Voronkov (born 1959) is a Professor of Formal methods in the Department of Computer Science at the University of Manchester.

Education
Voronkov was educated at Novosibirsk State University, graduating with a PhD in 1987.

Research
Voronkov is known for the Vampire automated theorem prover, the EasyChair conference management software, the Handbook of Automated Reasoning (with John Alan Robinson, 2001), and as organiser of the Alan Turing Centenary Conference 2012.

Voronkov's research has been funded by the Engineering and Physical Sciences Research Council (EPSRC).

Awards and honours
In 2015, his contributions to the field of automated reasoning were recognized with the Herbrand Award. He has won 25 division titles in the CADE ATP System Competition (CASC) at the Conference on Automated Deduction (CADE) since 1999.

Personal life
Voronkov is married and has three children. A son and two daughters.
He lives in Bramhall with his family.

References

Academics of the University of Manchester
People associated with the Department of Computer Science, University of Manchester
Living people
1959 births
Academic staff of Novosibirsk State University
Novosibirsk State University alumni